Wahlberg is a surname of Swedish origin. Notable people with the name include:

 Alfred Wahlberg (1834–1906), Swedish landscape painter from Stockholm
 Christina Wahlberg (born 1943), Swedish fencer, 1964 Summer Olympics
 David Emanuel Wahlberg (1882–1949), Swedish sports writer
 Donnie Wahlberg (born 1969), American singer, actor and producer
 Ernst Wahlberg (1904–1977), Swedish footballer, Swedish national team
 Gideon Wahlberg (1890–1948), Swedish actor, screenwriter and film director
 Johan August Wahlberg (1810–1856), Swedish naturalist and explorer
 Julia Wahlberg (born 1995), Swedish women's league footballer for Kopparbergs/Göteborg FC
 Kajsa Wahlberg (birthdate not public), Detective Inspector of Swedish Police Authority and National Rapporteur on human trafficking
 Karin Wahlberg (born 1950), Swedish obstetrician and author
 Karl Wahlberg (1874–1934), Swedish curler, silver medal at 1924 Winter Olympics
 Mark Wahlberg (born 1971), American actor and television producer, also known in music as Marky Mark
 Paul A. Wahlberg (born 1964), co-founder of Wahlburgers and lead in similarly titled TV reality show
 Peter Fredrik Wahlberg (1820–1906), Swedish entomologist and professor
 Rhea (Durham) Wahlberg (born 1978) American fashion model
 Robert Wahlberg (born 1967), American actor
 Stefan Wahlberg (born 1966), Swedish television producer, journalist and columnist

See also
 Walberg, surname
 Walburg (disambiguation), includes a list of people with surname Walburg
 Wallberg (disambiguation), includes a list of people with surname Wallberg
 Wallburg (disambiguation), includes a list of people with surname Wallburg

Swedish-language surnames